Walter Charles James, 1st Baron Northbourne (3 June 1816 – 4 February 1893), known as Sir Walter James, 2nd Baronet, from 1829 to 1884, was a British Member of Parliament.

James was the son of John James, Minister Plenipotentiary to the Netherlands, and grandson of Sir Walter James, 1st Baronet. He succeeded his grandfather in the baronetcy in 1829 and in 1837 he was elected to the House of Commons for Kingston upon Hull as a Tory, a seat he held until 1847. He acquired Betteshanger House (now Northbourne Park school) in Kent in 1850 and commissioned George Devey to oversee extensions and alterations to the house.

He served as High Sheriff of Kent for 1855. He was a friend of William Ewart Gladstone and in 1884, during Gladstone's second term as Prime Minister, he was raised to the peerage as Baron Northbourne, of Betteshanger in the County of Kent. From at least 1882 James was the lord of the manor of Langdon.

Lord Northbourne married Sarah Caroline, daughter of Cuthbert Ellison, in 1841. She died in 1890. Lord Northbourne survived her by three years and died in February 1893, aged 76. He was succeeded in his titles by his son Walter.

Ancestry

References

External links

1816 births
1893 deaths
Members of the Parliament of the United Kingdom for English constituencies
UK MPs 1837–1841
UK MPs 1841–1847
UK MPs who were granted peerages
Members of the Canterbury Association
High Sheriffs of Kent
Peers of the United Kingdom created by Queen Victoria
People from Betteshanger
Walter 1